Hotel Roxy, formerly the H. B. Davis Building is a historic building in Atlanta, Georgia. It was built in 1921. The commercial building was renovated in 1995 and adapted into loft apartments and a retail/ restaurant space.

The building was added to the National Register of Historic Places in 1997.

The building is located at 764–772 Marietta Street.

It is a red brick building with bricks laid in common bond with six stretcher courses.

See also
National Register of Historic Places listings in Fulton County, Georgia

References

External links
Hotel Roxy website

Hotel buildings on the National Register of Historic Places in Georgia (U.S. state)
Commercial buildings on the National Register of Historic Places in Georgia (U.S. state)
Hotel buildings completed in 1921
National Register of Historic Places in Atlanta